Merseybank is a suburb of Chorlton-cum-Hardy situated towards West Didsbury 4 miles south of Manchester city centre, England.

Areas of Manchester
Housing estates in England